Willard is an unincorporated community located in Logan County, Colorado, United States.  The U.S. Post Office at Merino (ZIP Code 80741) now serves Willard postal addresses.

Willard was named for Willard House, who owned land in the area.

Geography 
Willard is located at  (40.554374,-103.485546).

References 

Unincorporated communities in Logan County, Colorado
Unincorporated communities in Colorado